Susa is a railway station in Susa, Piedmont. The station is located on the Bussoleno-Susa branch of the Turin-Modane railway. The train services are operated by Trenitalia.

Train services
The station is served by the following services:

Turin Metropolitan services (SFM3) Susa - Bussoleno - Turin

References

 This article is based upon a translation of the Italian language version as of October 2015.

External links

Railway stations in Piedmont
Railway stations opened in 1854
1854 establishments in the Kingdom of Sardinia